The 1990 Buffalo Bills season was the 31st for the franchise and the 21st in the National Football League (NFL). The team finished the year with a record of 13 wins and 3 losses, and first in the American Football Conference (AFC) East division. They were 8–0 at home for the second time in their franchise history. On the road, the Bills were 5–3. Buffalo qualified for their first Super Bowl appearance.

The Bills' offense was one of the best in the league; their 428 points (26.75 points per game) scored was first in the league, and since they only gave up 263 points (6th in the league), their point differential was 165 points (10.3 per game), which was the best in the NFL in 1990, as well as the best point-differential in franchise history. Buffalo's 48 offensive touchdowns (28 passing, 20 rushing) also led the league.

Defensive end Bruce Smith was named Associated Press Defensive Player of the Year for 1990, recording 101 tackles, four forced fumbles, and a career-high 19 sacks.

The season was chronicled on October 2, 2008 for America's Game: The Missing Rings, as one of the five greatest NFL teams to never win the Super Bowl.

Offseason

NFL draft

Personnel

Staff

Roster

Regular season
Bruce Smith set a club record with 19 sacks. Smith also had 101 tackles.

 September 24, 1990 – Thurman Thomas rushed for 214 yards versus the New York Jets. It was the second highest total in the history of Monday Night Football.
 Bruce Smith had 8 tackles, 2 sacks, and 4 hurries in the Bills 30–23 victory over Philadelphia.
 Bruce Smith had 9 tackles, 4 sacks, and 2 pressures in the Bills victory over Indianapolis.

Schedule

Game summaries

Week 1 vs. Colts

Week 2

The Bills offense never got rolling and were soundly defeated on the road, 30–7, to their rival Miami Dolphins.

Week 3

Source: Pro-Football-Reference.com

Week 4

    
    
    
    
    
    
    
    
    

The Bills avenged their 1989 Monday Night defeat against the defending AFC Champion Broncos.  The Broncos rushed for 208 yards, led 21–9 after three quarters, and held Jim Kelly and the offense to just 197 yards of offense, but the pivotal play of the game erupted in the fourth on a touchdown return of a blocked Bronco field goal by linebacker Cornelius Bennett.  The Bills then scored on a John Elway interception and ultimately won 29–28.

Week 5

The Bills, on Sunday Night Football, trailed 24–14 in the fourth quarter before erupting to 24 points to defeat the then-unbeaten Los Angeles Raiders, 38–24.  Among the fourth quarter scores were a blocked punt by Steve Tasker, returned by J.D. Williams, where Skip Caray burst into saying "They've done it again, they've done it again!" referencing the prior weeks block of a field goal for a TD return vs Denver....and a fumble return by Nate Odomes.

Week 7

For the third straight game the Bills erased a two-score gap for the win. The Jets led 21–7 in the second quarter and 24–17 in the third, but Kelly's 60-yard score to James Lofton tied the game entering the fourth quarter. Jamie Mueller's touchdown catch then won it, 30–27.

Week 8

The Bills beat the Patriots 27-10 at Foxboro Stadium, known as Sullivan Stadium at the time.

Week 9

The Bills avenged last season's playoff loss by destroying the Cleveland Browns in their own stadium 42–0.

Week 10

The Bills welcomed the NFC East team Phoenix Cardinals to an extremely windy Rich Stadium, and defeated them 45–14.

Week 11

The Bills, led by 209 yards on the ground (including an 80 yard Thurman Thomas TD run), shut out the Patriots 14-0 at Rich Stadium.

Week 12

A year after Buffalo's epic 47–41 win at the Astrodome they returned there at 9-1 to face the 5–5 Oilers on Monday Night Football.  This time the Oilers made sure there would be no comeback as Warren Moon and Lorenzo White authored 425 combined yards of offense and three touchdowns.  Kelly managed two touchdowns and a pick as the Bills fell 27–24 to their former division foe.

Week 13

    
    
    
    
    
    
    
    
    
    

The Bills opened the game in the no-huddle offense and used it the whole game.  The Bills went up 24–0 in the 1st qtr and eventually won the game 30–23.

Week 14

Week 15

The Bills pulled out a close win this Saturday afternoon, in a game in which both starting quarterbacks went down with injuries. Jim Kelly, and New York QB Phil Simms, with the latter being out for the season.

Week 16

The Bills, under backup quarterback Frank Reich, defeated the Miami Dolphins and wrapped up the AFC East title.  Reich connected with James Lofton and Andre Reed for touchdowns, ultimately winning 24–14 despite fourteen penalties to five for Miami.

Week 17

Bills Head Coach Marv Levy decided to rest his starters for the playoffs, dropping the final game of the season in Washington, 29–14. The Bills finished with their best record in team history at 13 wins 3 losses.

Standings

Playoffs

AFC Divisional Playoffs
Miami Dolphins (12–4) at Buffalo Bills (13–3)

Despite being a close score, the Bills never trailed in this classic Jim Kelly versus Dan Marino shootout. The weather, steady light snow, had crews occasionally come out to shovel off the 10- and 5-yard lines. Despite the conditions, both team offenses were explosive. In the end, after winning the AFC East crown from the Dolphins a few weeks earlier, the Bills also ended the 'Fins season in a game which had 78 combined points.

AFC Championship Game
Los Angeles Raiders (13–4) at Buffalo Bills (14–3)

The Bills shredded the Raiders, limiting quarterback Jay Schroeder to 13 of 31 completions for 150 yards and intercepting him 5 times, while also holding running back Marcus Allen to just 26 yards on 10 carries. The Raiders offense clearly missed running back Bo Jackson, who suffered what would turn out to be a career-ending injury the week before in a win against the Cincinnati Bengals. On offense, the Bills amassed 502 total yards, including 202 yards on the ground.  Running back Thurman Thomas rushed for 138 and a touchdown while also catching 5 passes for 61 yards, while running back Kenneth Davis tied an AFC playoff record with 3 rushing touchdowns. Buffalo also set an NFL playoff record by scoring 41 points in the first half. Bills quarterback Jim Kelly threw for 300 yards and two touchdown passes to wide receiver James Lofton, who finished the game with 5 receptions for 113 yards. Thomas recorded a 12-yard touchdown run, while Davis scored from 1 yard, 3 yards, and 1 yard out. Linebacker Darryl Talley returned one of his two interceptions 27 yards for a touchdown.

Super Bowl XXV

To counteract the Bills' no-huddle offense, the Giants' strategy was to use a power running game utilizing O.J. Anderson, aided by quarterback rollouts, bootlegs, and play-action fakes. As tight end Mark Bavaro later recalled, "[w]e came out with three tight ends, fat slobs picking you up and moving you and letting you tackle O.J., if you could." This enabled them to take time off the clock and limit Buffalo's possessions. The Giants set a Super Bowl record for time of possession with 40 minutes, 33 seconds, including 22 minutes in the second half. On defense, New York wanted to be physical with Buffalo's wideouts, and play with extra defensive backs to concentrate on stopping the Bills passing game, while conceding the running game.

The contrast in strategies was evident during the first period. After forcing the Bills to punt on the opening drive of the game, the Giants consumed 6:15 off the clock by marching 58 yards in 10 plays to score on a 28-yard field goal from Matt Bahr. In that drive, New York ran five rushing plays and five passing plays. But the Bills struck right back on their ensuing possession with a five-play, 66-yard drive that took 1:23 off the clock, including a tipped 61-yard completion from quarterback Jim Kelly to receiver James Lofton that set up Scott Norwood's 23-yard field goal to tie the game at 3–3.

After forcing the Giants to punt on their ensuing possession, the Bills' offensive strategy started to work to perfection. Kelly led the Bills on a 12-play, 80-yard scoring drive that consumed 4:27 and moved the ball so effectively that the team never faced a third down. Kelly completed six consecutive passes (four to Andre Reed) for 62 yards, and running back Don Smith capped it off with a one-yard touchdown run to give Buffalo a 10–3 lead. Smith's 1-yard touchdown run was his only carry of the game and the last carry of his career. Reed's 5 first quarter receptions were a Super Bowl record.

After trading punts, the Giants were pinned at their own 7-yard line. On second down, defensive lineman Bruce Smith sacked quarterback Jeff Hostetler in the end zone for a safety, increasing the Bills' lead 12–3. On the play, Smith had a chance to force a fumble since Hostetler was holding the football with only his throwing hand. But to his credit, Hostetler held the ball away from Smith, helping to ensure that only 2 points would be surrendered.

The Bills started out on their next drive with great field position following the free kick, but were forced to punt after 3 plays. Taking the ball at their own 13-yard line with 3:43 left in the second quarter, the Giants abandoned their long drive strategy and employed a quick strike attack of their own. Hostetler led the Giants 87 yards, scoring on a 14-yard touchdown pass to wide receiver Stephen Baker with just 25 seconds left in the half to cut New York's deficit to 12–10.

The Giants then opened the third quarter and resumed their original game strategy by driving 75 yards in 14 plays to score on Ottis Anderson's one-yard touchdown run, taking their first lead of the game since their opening possession at 17–12. The drive consumed a Super Bowl record nine minutes and 29 seconds, and included four successful third down conversions. The highlight was a 14-yard pass to wide receiver Mark Ingram on 3rd down and 13 yards to go. Ingram caught a short pass and broke five Buffalo tackles to get the first down and keep the drive alive.

After forcing Buffalo to punt on their ensuing possession, New York drove to the Bills' 35-yard line. But on fourth and two, Smith tackled Anderson for a 2-yard loss. Buffalo then took over and stormed down the field, advancing 63 yards in just four plays and scoring on a 31-yard burst from running back Thurman Thomas on the first play of the fourth quarter, regaining the lead at 19–17. Thomas' fourth-quarter touchdown run marked 1,000 points scored in Super Bowl history (1,001 with the extra point).

However, before the Bills' defenders had a chance to catch their breath, they found themselves back on the field trying to contain another long Giants drive. This one went for 14 plays and 74 yards, half of which came off passes from Hostetler to tight end Mark Bavaro, and took another 7:32 off the clock. The Bills managed to halt the drive at their own 3-yard line when linebacker Cornelius Bennett broke up Hostetler's third down pass, but Bahr kicked his second field goal to give New York a 20–19 lead.

On the Bills' ensuing possession, they could only advance to their own 41-yard line before having to punt, enabling the Giants to take more time off the clock. The Bills finally forced New York to punt and took the ball at their own 10-yard line with 2:16 remaining. Kelly then led them down the field with a mix of scrambles, short passes, and Thomas runs. Buffalo drove to the Giants' 29-yard line, setting up Norwood for a 47-yard field goal attempt with eight seconds left. However, his kick barely sailed wide right, sealing New York's victory with 4 seconds left.

Player stats

Thurman Thomas
Thomas led the NFL in total yards from scrimmage for the second consecutive season. His 1,297 yards led the AFC and was second in the NFL to Barry Sanders. Thomas had at least 100 total yards in 10 of the Bills 16 games. After gaining 219 total yards versus the New York Jets, Thomas was named AFC offensive player of the week. 
Note: Rush = Rushing Yards; REC = Receiving Yards

Awards and records
 Led NFL in Points Scored, 428
 Jim Kelly, NFL Passing Leader, 101.2 Passer Rating
 Jim Kelly, Most Valuable Player, Pro Bowl
 Bruce Smith, NFL Defensive Player of the Year
 Bruce Smith, UPI AFL-AFC Player of the Year, Defense
 Bruce Smith, Newspaper Enterprise Association Defensive Player of the Year Award
 Bruce Smith, Team Record, Number of Sacks in a Single Season, (19)
 Bruce Smith, AFC Defensive Player of the Month, December
 Thurman Thomas, NFL Combined Yards from Scrimmage Leader

References

External links
 1990 Buffalo Bills  at Pro-Football-Reference.com

Buffalo Bills
AFC East championship seasons
American Football Conference championship seasons
Buffalo Bills seasons
Buff